Enlight Quickshot is a photo editing app designed to simplify the editing process. It is made by Lightricks.

History
Enlight Quickshot was released in August 2017. It is available as a free version with in-app-purchases.  Quickshot has had over 1 million downloads.
 
The app originally featured four AI-powered modes with auto adjustment features as well as a photo gallery with batch editing tools. The four shooting modes were: HDR, Quickshot, Photo, and Strobe.
 
The app’s name derives from the “quickshot” mode which automatically aligned photos, fixed the lighting and previewed filters before the picture was taken.

Editing Features

Editing options are Magic which is a retouch feature  and Looks that can change the picture with one click.
It was revealed influencer Tupi Saravia was using Quickshot’s most well-known feature, the Sky feature to insert the same cloud formation image into her pictures.  As a result of the publicity, she started working for Quickshot as a brand ambassador.

References 

2017 software
Freeware
Photo software